This article is about the particular significance of the year 1903 to Wales and its people.

Incumbents 

Archdruid of the National Eisteddfod of Wales – Hwfa Môn
Lord Lieutenant of Anglesey – Sir Richard Henry Williams-Bulkeley, 12th Baronet  
Lord Lieutenant of Brecknockshire – Joseph Bailey, 1st Baron Glanusk
Lord Lieutenant of Caernarvonshire – John Ernest Greaves
Lord Lieutenant of Cardiganshire – Herbert Davies-Evans
Lord Lieutenant of Carmarthenshire – Sir James Williams-Drummond, 4th Baronet
Lord Lieutenant of Denbighshire – William Cornwallis-West    
Lord Lieutenant of Flintshire – Hugh Robert Hughes 
Lord Lieutenant of Glamorgan – Robert Windsor-Clive, 1st Earl of Plymouth
Lord Lieutenant of Merionethshire – W. R. M. Wynne 
Lord Lieutenant of Monmouthshire – Godfrey Morgan, 1st Viscount Tredegar
Lord Lieutenant of Montgomeryshire – Sir Herbert Williams-Wynn, 7th Baronet 
Lord Lieutenant of Pembrokeshire – Frederick Campbell, 3rd Earl Cawdor
Lord Lieutenant of Radnorshire – Powlett Milbank
Bishop of Bangor – Watkin Williams 
Bishop of Llandaff – Richard Lewis
Bishop of St Asaph – A. G. Edwards (later Archbishop of Wales) 
Bishop of St Davids – John Owen

Events
4 April - Operations begin on
 Welshpool and Llanfair Light Railway.
 Wrexham and District Electric Tramways.
14 November - End of the lock-out at Penrhyn Quarry near Bethesda (begun 1900), the longest major industrial dispute in British history.
Sygun Copper Mine is abandoned.
Closure of the life-boat station on Ynys Llanddwyn.

Arts and literature
Arthur Machen marries Dorothie Purefoy Hudleston.

Awards
National Eisteddfod of Wales - held in Llanelli
Chair - John Thomas Job, "Y Celt"
Crown - John Evans Davies

Cinema
July - William Haggar releases Desperate Poaching Affray, seen as an important influence on the chase genre of film.

New books

English language
J. Romilly Allen - Celtic Art in Pagan and Christian Times
Sabine Baring-Gould - A Book of North Wales
Bertrand Russell - The Principles of Mathematics

Welsh language
Jonathan Ceredig Davies - Awstralia Orllewinol
D. M. Lewis - Cofiant y Diweddar Barchedig Evan Lewis, Brynberian, 1813-96
Llyfe Mormon (translation of the Book of Mormon)

Music

Sport

Births
1 January – Horace Evans, royal physician (died 1963)
9 February – Gipsy Daniels, Welsh boxer
24 March – Gwilym R. Jones, poet and editor (died 1993)
14 April – Glyn Simon, Archbishop of Wales (1968–71; died 1972)
17 April – Thomas Rowland Hughes, novelist, poet and dramatist (died 1949)
1 May – Geraint Goodwin, writer (died 1941)
9 May – Tudor Watkins, Baron Watkins, politician (died 1983)
6 June – Ceri Richards, artist (died 1971)
22 June – Harry Phillips, Wales international rugby player (died 1978)
18 August – Dorothy Edwards, novelist (died 1934)
8 November – Ronald Lockley, ornithologist and naturalist (died 2000)
22 November – David Rees-Williams, 1st Baron Ogmore (died 1976)
2 December – Jim Sullivan, Wales and British Isles rugby league player (died 1977)
6 December
E. D. Jones, librarian of National Library of Wales (died 1987)
Will Paynter, miners’ leader (died 1984)

Deaths
15 January – David Howell, Dean of St Davids, 71
30 January – William Jones, historian, 73
17 February – Joseph Parry, composer, 61
19 February - Samuel Arthur Brain, businessman and politician, 53
8 March – Morgan Thomas, surgeon, 78
12 April – Daniel Silvan Evans, writer and lexicographer, 85
18 May – Richard Mills the younger, composer and music teacher, 62/3
19 June – Herbert Vaughan, Archbishop of Westminster, 71
24 June – Richard Fothergill, coal-owner and politician, 80
15 August – John Pryce, clergyman and writer, Dean of Bangor, 73
13 October – Morgan B. Williams, United States politician, 72
18 September – Sir Llewellyn Turner, politician, 80
9 December – Eliezer Pugh, philanthropist, 87
date unknown Sir Walter Morgan, judge, about 82

References

Wales